Saint Hans Church (Danish: Sankt Hans Kirke) is a church in Odense, Denmark. First mentioned in 1295, it was built by the Knights Hospitaller, also known as the Order of Saint John. 

Not much of the original building remains as it was rebuilt in 1636 and subsequently restored on two occasions. Built of red brick with horizontal decorations on the chancel wall, it has large Gothic windows. The date of 1496 on one of the bells in the step-ribbed tower may well be the year the church was completed. The tower is adjacent to Odense Palace which was originally built as a monastery.

The church has a three manual Marcussen organ used by Kevin Bowyer to record the complete organ works of Bach for Nimbus Records.

References

Churches in Odense
Churches in the diocese of Funen

Lutheran churches converted from Roman Catholicism